Inkognitogata is a tram stop on the Briskeby Line (Briskebylinjen) in Oslo, Norway. Inkognitogata is a street which  begins at Uranienborg Road and follows Slottsparken all the way towards the Oslofjord, to Henrik Ibsens gate (formerly Drammensveien). The tram station is situated between Riddervolds plass and Nationaltheatret. It is serviced by line 11, which is served by SL79 trams. It’s also possible to transfer to the stop Solli (Platforms A and B).

See also
 Trams in Oslo

References

External links 
 

Oslo Tramway stations in Oslo